Ward Field is a 2,500-seat stadium in Bourbonnais, Illinois. It is home to the Olivet Nazarene University Tigers football team. Since 2002, Ward Field has hosted the Chicago Bears training camp.

American football venues in Illinois
College football venues
Olivet Nazarene Tigers football
Buildings and structures in Kankakee County, Illinois